Cristian Popescu (1 June 1959 – 21 February 1995) was one of the most important Romanian poets of the 1990s.

Born in Bucharest, he completed his studies at the Faculty of Letters of the University of Bucharest.

References

External links

Romanian male poets
1959 births
1995 deaths
Writers from Bucharest
University of Bucharest alumni
20th-century Romanian poets
20th-century Romanian male writers